Lac à la Perdrix is a lake in Cantley, Quebec, Canada, near the border with Ontario, north of Ottawa. It is about 15-20 mins away from the national capital and is surrounded by beautiful cottages. This lake has many beautiful aspects that only residents can benefit!

References 

Lakes of Outaouais